The Drake Bulldogs men's soccer team represent Drake University in the Missouri Valley Conference of NCAA Division I soccer. The team plays its home matches at Cownie Sports Complex on the south side of Des Moines, Iowa.

History
The Drake program began in 1986. Under coach Bob Wood, the Bulldogs would compile a 16–16 record over two seasons as an independent before joining the Big Central Soccer Conference for the 1988 season. After a three-year run in the BCSC saw Drake post a collective 29–25–4 record (8–7–3 in conference), the Bulldogs would join their traditional sporting conference, the Missouri Valley Conference, for the 1991 season.

Upon joining the MVC, the Bulldogs went 6–10–0 (1–2–0) in 1991 season and 6–12–2 (2–2–1) in 1992. The Bulldogs would bounce back to post three consecutive winning seasons for the first time in school history from 1993 to 1995 (including a record-best 4–2–0 mark in 1994 MVC play). During his final seasons, Wood's teams totaled a combined 14–21–1 record in 1996–1997.

For the 1998 season, Drake hired Swiss-born Canadian, 32-year-old Evansville assistant Sean Holmes. In 1998, the Bulldogs earned a 6–11–1 mark. In 1999, Drake went 4–13–1 (1–5–1).

For the 2003 season, the Bulldogs moved from the larger Drake Stadium into the more-intimate off-campus Cownie Sports Complex, and Holmes began to turn the program around, guiding the Bulldogs to a fourth-place finish in the conference, good enough to host a quarterfinal match in the conference tournament. The 2003 squad achieved the first top 25 ranking in the program's history. The 2004 squad would begin the season ranked for the first time in school history, and the 2005 season saw victories over three ranked opponents, including a win over then-sixteenth-ranked Creighton for the first time in school history.

In 2008, Holmes' Drake squad had a breakout season. Drake would win a school-record 13 matches (against 5 losses and 1 draw) and earned an NCAA Tournament berth for the first time. Drawn into the Queens, New York region of the bracket, the Bulldogs would battle hard at Saint Louis before falling on a goal just 4.1 seconds away from penalty kicks.

The 2009 season saw Holmes' team take the program to new heights. Hosting the Missouri Valley Conference tournament after finishing second in the regular season, the Bulldogs edged third-seeded Creighton, 2–1, before defeating fourth-seeded Evansville, 2–1, to win the school's first-ever conference tournament title and clinching their second consecutive College Cup appearance. In the tournament, the Bulldogs would earn their first-ever NCAA victory with a 2–1 win over Western Illinois and then stunned fourth-seeded Ohio State 1–0 to advance to the Sweet 16 In the Sweet 16, after falling behind 2–0, the Bulldogs rallied to a stunning 6–4 win at Boston College before falling in a 2–1 heartbreaker to No. 5 North Carolina in the national quarterfinals.

Hours before the start of the 2015 season, Drake announced that assistant Gareth Smith would replace 17-year head coach Holmes to become interim head coach. Smith was promoted to head coach after Drake finished third in the MVC regular season. The third seeded Bulldogs then won three consecutive matches in the conference tournament to earn the conference's automatic bid to the 2015 NCAA Division I Men's Soccer Championship. In the tournament, the Bulldogs knocked of No. 17 Kentucky 2–1 in the first round before falling to former MVC member Creighton in the second round.

All-Time record

Seasons

Notable former players
The players in bold have senior international caps.

  Ezra Hendrickson featured for six different Major League Soccer (MLS) clubs, was a three-time MLS Cup winner (2002, 2004, 2008), and earned 123 international appearances with Saint Vincent and the Grenadines before serving as an assistant coach with several MLS clubs
  Aaron Leventhal played for the Minnesota Thunder of the USL A-League from 1995 to 2001
  Kirk Wilson was selected in the first round of the 1999 MLS Supplemental Draft and played for the Dallas Burn of Major League Soccer and the El Paso Patriots, Rochester Raging Rhinos, and Impact de Montreal of the USL A-League and USL First Division
  Matt Nickell was selected in the first round of the 2005 MLS Supplemental Draft and made seven appearances with D.C. United from 2005 to 2006
  Jesse Baker played for the Minnesota Thunder of the USL First Division in 2006
  Corey Farabi was selected by the Kansas City Wizards in the third round of the 2006 MLS Supplemental Draft and made several reserve appearances with the club
  Chris Hamburger was selected by the Kansas City Wizards in the fourth round of the 2006 MLS Supplemental Draft
  Garrett Webb played for Capital City F.C. of the Canadian Soccer League in 2011.
  Julien Edwards played for Capital City F.C. of the Canadian Soccer League in 2011 and was called up by Guyana for World Cup qualifying
  Besmir Bega played for KF Tirana and Partizani Tirana of the Albanian Superliga in 2008–09.
  Matt Kuhn was selected by D.C. United in the fourth round of the 2012 MLS Supplemental Draft
  Darrin MacLeod currently plays for North Carolina FC
  Steven Enna currently plays for FC Fredericia in Denmark

References

External links
 

 
1986 establishments in Iowa
Association football clubs established in 1986